The IPSC Swedish Rifle Championship is an IPSC level 3 championship held once a year by the Swedish Dynamic Sports Shooting Association.

Champions 
The following is a list of current and previous champions.

Overall category

Lady category

Senior category

See also 
Swedish Handgun Championship
Swedish Mini Rifle Championship
Swedish Shotgun Championship

References 

Match Results - 2011 IPSC Swedish Rifle Championship
Match Results - 2012 IPSC Swedish Rifle Championship
Match Results - 2013 IPSC Swedish Rifle Championship
Match Results - 2014 IPSC Swedish Rifle Championship
Match Results - 2016 IPSC Swedish Rifle Championship
Match Results - 2017 IPSC Swedish Rifle Championship

IPSC shooting competitions
National shooting championships
Sweden sport-related lists
Shooting competitions in Sweden